Peter Croft may refer to:

Peter Croft (physician), English physician and primary care researcher
Peter Downton Croft (1933–2021), English field hockey player and cricketer
Peter Croft (climber) (born 1958), rock climber and mountaineer
Peter Croft (sport shooter) (born 1950), English sport shooter